Palanivel or Palanivelu is a Tamil male given name. Due to the Tamil tradition of using patronymic surnames it may also be a surname for males and females.

Notable people with the name include:

P. T. R. Palanivel Rajan (1932–2006), Indian politician
Palanivel Thiagarajan (born 1966), his son, Indian politician
G. Palanivel (born 1949), Malaysian politician and government minister
Haridwaramangalam A. K. Palanivel (born 1948), Indian percussionist
N. Palanivel, Indian politician in the 1970s and 1980s

Indian masculine given names
Tamil masculine given names